Hulusi is a masculine Turkish given name, it may refer to:

Given name

 Hulusi Akar (born 1952), Turkish Army general
 Hulusi Behçet (1889–1948), Turkish dermatologist and scientist
 Hulusi Kentmen (1912–1993), Turkish actor
 Hulusi Salih Pasha (1864–1939), Ottoman grand vizier
 Hulusi Sayın (1926–1991), Turkish Gendarmerie general
 İhap Hulusi Görey (1898–1986), Turkish graphic artist
 Mehmet Hulusi Conk (1881–1950), Ottoman Army officer
 Salih Hulusi Pasha (1864–1939), Grand Viziers of the Ottoman Empire

Surname
 Ahmed Hulusi, Turkish Islamic philosophical and religious author

See also
 Hulusi, free reed wind instrument from China

Turkish-language surnames
Turkish masculine given names